Bedřich Pokorný (6 March 1904 Brno – 25 March 1968 Brno) was a Czechoslovak communist secret service officer and an agent of the Státní bezpečnost.

Pokorný joined the Czechoslovak Army in 1924 and began attending the Military Academy at Hranice in 1926. After finishing courses in military intelligence in 1934, he was appointed an intelligence officer of the 12th Division in Košice and later in Prešov and worked in espionage aiming against the Kingdom of Hungary.

After the occupation of Czech lands and creation of the Slovak state he returned home. Like many other officers of the former Czechoslovak Army he got a job in the protectorate administration and became a financial clerk of the Moravian land office in Brno. During the occupation he reportedly cooperated with several resistance groups, including that run by the Communist Party of Czechoslovakia. His active resistance was later, during the show trials in the '50s, alleged to have been fictional and he was accused instead of collaboration with the Nazis.

In April 1945, after the liberation of Brno by the Red Army, he took over command of the newly organized Czech police and in May he became a police commander in Moravia. During the summer of 1945 he and many other senior Czechoslovakian officials organized both ethnic cleansing and expulsion against the Sudeten Germans. This included the so-called Brno death march. In July 1945 Pokorný joined the Communist Party and was appointed commander of one of the intelligence service sections of the Ministry of Interior in Prague. During the retribution Pokorný led the investigation against many of the German war criminals, but he has since been accused of faking some testimonies and forging evidence to harm the communist party's opponents.

In January 1951 Pokorný was arrested and in December 1953 sentenced in a show trial to 16 years imprisonment for sabotage, conspiracy, protection of former Gestapo agents and collaborators, and other activities, which supposedly hindered the work of the police. The sentence was quashed in November 1956 and Pokorný was released, rehabilitated and had his party membership restored.

In March 1968, during the Prague Spring, Pokorný hanged himself in a forest near Brno.

References

Resources 
 Karel Kaplan & František Svátek: Die politischen Säuberungen in der KPC. In Weber/Mählert: Terror – Stalinistische Parteisäuberungen 1936–1953. Schöning Verlag 1998, p. 546 ff. 
 Jiřina Dvořáková: Bedřich Pokorný – vzestup a pád (PDF)

1904 births
1968 deaths
Communist Party of Czechoslovakia members
Czech mass murderers
Czechoslovak prisoners and detainees
Ethnic cleansing of Germans
Genocide perpetrators
Military personnel from Brno
People from the Margraviate of Moravia
People of the StB
Politicide perpetrators
Suicides by hanging in Czechoslovakia
Prisoners and detainees of Czechoslovakia